The U.S. state of Missouri has a storied musical history. It has been the scene of major developments in several popular music genres as well as the birthplace of many notable musicians. St. Louis was an important venue for early blues and jazz, as well as country and bluegrass. Kansas City is home to famous performers such as Charlie Parker, Count Basie, Lester Young, and its own distinct jazz style. Ragtime got its influential hold in the city of Sedalia, Missouri, thanks to Scott Joplin and his publisher John Stark, and through another Missouri native, James Scott.

Rock and roll pioneers Big Joe Turner and Chuck Berry were born in Kansas City and St. Louis, respectively, and folk singer Ella Jenkins was also born in St. Louis. Hillbilly music developed in the Ozarks of southern Missouri, and from 1955 to 1961, Springfield was home to some of the first national country music programs on American television. Since the 1980s, Branson, Missouri has emerged as a country music tourist mecca. In the 1990s, St. Louis area band Uncle Tupelo blended punk, rock, and country-influenced music styles with raucous performances and became pioneers of alt-country. Both St. Louis and Kansas City also have active hip-hop scenes; Tech N9ne was born in Kansas City and Eminem in St. Joseph, and Nelly and the St. Lunatics got their start in St. Louis. Sheryl Crow is from Kennett, Missouri and attended the University of Missouri School of Music.  Sara Evans, a Missourian hails from Howard County.

Indigenous music

Blues

Country blues singer and songwriter Lottie Kimbrough was born in West Bottoms, Kansas City, Missouri.

Classical
The St. Louis Symphony is one of the oldest orchestras in the United States. The University of Missouri School of Music was established in 1917 in Columbia, Missouri and has thousands of alumni.

Jazz

Jazz artists from Missouri include Dixieland jazz and ragtime clarinetist, composer, and bandleader Wilbur Sweatman; trumpeter, saxophonist, accordionist, and bandleader Charlie Creath; ragtime musician and composer Scott Joplin; bebop saxophonist and composer Charlie Parker; tenor saxophonists Coleman Hawkins, Ben Webster, and Jimmy Forrest; pianist and bandleader Bennie Moten; trumpeters Shorty Baker, Clark Terry, Lester Bowie, Louis Metcalf, and Baikida Carroll; violinist Eddie South; alto saxophonist, arranger, and composer Lennie Niehaus; saxophonist, clarinetist, arranger, composer, and bandleader Oliver Nelson; clarinetist Pee Wee Russell; double bassist Wendell Marshall; trombonists Joseph Bowie and Melba Liston; alto saxophonists Luther Thomas and Jimmy Woods; saxophonist and composer Ahmad Alaadeen; guitarists Grant Green, Pat Metheny, and Norman Brown; drummer Phillip Wilson; organists Wild Bill Davis, Milt Buckner, and Charles Kynard; smooth jazz musicians Bob James and David Sanborn; and singers Anita O'Day and Oleta Adams.

St. Louis' Gaslight Square entertainment district was an important area for jazz from the mid-1950s to 1960s. Jazz club Peacock Alley was the site of Miles Davis' recording of Miles Davis Quintet at Peacock Alley in 1956. The Black Artists' Group was a multidisciplinary art collective in St. Louis from 1968 to 1972 that fostered jazz and the Black Arts Movement in the city. BAG inspired the foundation of Human Arts Ensemble.

Rock and metal

The Urge are from St. Louis. Christofer Drew and his indie rock band Never Shout Never are from Joplin. Harlow from Kansas City signed to Greenworld records. Shaman's Harvest is from Jefferson City. Prog metal band Anacrusis is from St. Louis. In 2005, rock band Living Things gained national attention after the release of their album Ahead of the Lions. Cavo is from St. Louis. Puddle of Mudd is from Kansas City. Story Of The Year from St. Louis is multi-platinum. Greek Fire (band) Spawning from Story Of The Year also from St. Louis.

Hip-hop
Tech N9ne from Kansas City helped popularize the chopper rap style in the late 1990s and co-founded the Strange Music label. Nelly from St. Louis had four #1 Billboard Hot 100 hits in the early 2000s, including "Hot in Herre" in 2002, and one with Murphy Lee. Metro Boomin from St. Louis has multiple #1 Billboard Hot 100 hits due to his production.

Country
Branson, Missouri is a popular tourist destination in the Ozarks of southwestern Missouri with an association with mainstream country music. The town's popularity grew in the 1980s when a number of prominent country stars moved to the area, including Boxcar Willie, Sons of the Pioneers, and Roy Clark. Two major attractions had roots in the 1950s: the Shepherd of the Hills Theatre and Park, and Silver Dollar City. Modern music festivals in Branson include the Old-Time Fiddle Festival, Branson Jam, and the State of the Ozarks Fiddlers Convention. The largest music venue in Branson is the Grand Palace, which seats upwards of 4,000 people.

Prominent local attractions in Branson include entrepreneur and performer Jennifer Wilson, a regional celebrity known for her show at the Americana Theatre, the Mabe family's Baldknobbers jamboree, which has been running for three generations, and Jim Owen of the Jim Owen Morning Show.

The area's country music broadcasting history, however, can be traced to nearby Springfield, Missouri in the mid-1930s, when Ralph D. Foster's KWTO began carrying live performances and syndicating them to other stations across the country. The station's most famous program was Ozark Jubilee, which, starting in 1955, was carried live on ABC-TV across the country. Foster became a major figure in the region's music history; there is a museum named after him on the campus of the College of the Ozarks. Other national country music TV programs originating from Springfield included Five Star Jubilee and Talent Varieties. Television entertainers Porter Wagoner and Speck Rhodes were from West Plains, Missouri.

Branson's place as a tourist destination was sparked in large part by the publication of the popular novel The Shepherd of the Hills by Harold Bell Wright in 1907, which is set in the Branson area. It was the first novel in America to sell over a million copies, and readers flocked to Branson to see the places described in the book. The local music scene and a tourism industry developed as a result.

Alt-country/indie rock

Mid-1980s
In the mid-1980s, the Saint Louis area (and nearby southern Illinois) was home to garage rock band the Primitives and rock band the Blue Moons. The Blue Moons featured Festus native Mark Ortmann on drums and Brian Henneman.

1990s
The Primitives reorganized and transformed into Uncle Tupelo in the early 1990s. At the same time, Chicken Truck, an original outlaw country rock band, featuring Brian Henneman and drummer Mark Ortmann, was giving memorable performances in clubs such as Cicero's. Chicken Truck reorganized and became the indie roots rock band the Bottle Rockets in 1992. A country cover band called Coffee Creek linked all of these upstart bands. Coffee Creek was composed of Jay Farrar, Brian Henneman, Mike Heidorn, and Jeff Tweedy.

Uncle Tupelo disbanded in 1994. Founding members of Uncle Tupelo formed Son Volt and Wilco after the split.

Bottle Rockets became known for their hit songs, "Radar Gun", "$1,000 Car", and "I'll Be Comin' Around". Their success led to appearances on the television show Late Night with Conan O'Brien performing one of their original songs as well as being featured in a comedic skit.

2000s
After extensive remodeling, Cicero's, in the art district of University City, became what is currently known as Blueberry Hill's Duck Room. Chuck Berry performed there frequently until 2014, and the venue hosts national touring rock music artists.

Angel Olsen is a folk and indie rock singer, songwriter, and guitarist who was raised in St. Louis. Nathaniel Rateliff was born in St. Louis and grew up in Hermann before initially relocating to Colorado to work with an evangelical ministry, after which he soured on religion and began pursuing music professionally.

See also
Lucia Pamela 
Emma Lou Diemer
Culture of St. Louis 
American folk music
University of Missouri School of Music

References

 
 
 Hogeland, William (March 14, 2004),  Emulating the Real and Vital Guthrie, Not St. Woody, New York Times.

 The Mississippi River Of Song: The Grassroots of American Music. Smithsonian Institution and the Filmmakers Collaborative, 1999.
 Gilbert, Barry (May 5, 2008), Bottle Rockets Blaze in Launching Their 15th Anniversary Concerts, Saint Louis Post-Dispatch.
 Blackstock, Peter (December 7, 2007), if kerosene works, why not gasoline?, No Depression.

Notes

 
Missouri culture
Missouri